Encryphodes is a genus of snout moths. It was described by Turner in 1913.

Species
 Encryphodes aenictopa Turner, 1913
 Encryphodes ethiopella Balinsky, 1991

References

Phycitini
Pyralidae genera